Great Ness is a civil parish in Shropshire, England.  It contains 26 listed buildings that are recorded in the National Heritage List for England.  Of these, one is listed at Grade I, the highest of the three grades, one is at Grade II*, the middle grade, and the others are at Grade II, the lowest grade. The parish contains the village of Great Ness and smaller settlements, including Alderton, Kinton, and Nesscliffe, and is otherwise rural.  Most of the listed buildings are houses, farmhouses and farm buildings, and the other listed buildings include a church and items in the churchyard, a hotel, milestones, and a war memorial.


Key

Buildings

References

Citations

Sources

Lists of buildings and structures in Shropshire